Gracias Saldanha was CEO of Glenmark Pharmaceuticals.

He had two sons, Glenn Saldanha, the current Managing Director & Chairman of Glenmark Pharmaceuticals, and Mark Saldanha, the owner and CEO of Marksans Pharma.

References

1938 births
2012 deaths
Businesspeople from Mumbai